The Spokane Chiefs are a major junior ice hockey team that plays in the Western Hockey League based out of Spokane, Washington. The team plays its home games at the Spokane Arena. Their uniforms are similar to those of the NHL's Montreal Canadiens. Spokane consistently ranks in the top 10 in the Canadian Hockey League in attendance. The Chiefs won the Memorial Cup in 1991 and 2008. They also hosted the first outdoor hockey game in WHL history on January 15, 2011, at Avista Stadium versus the Kootenay Ice.

History

The Spokane Chiefs was the name of the hockey team that played in the Western International Hockey League (WIHL) from 1982 to 1985. In their final year, the Chiefs were the regular season champions of the WIHL.

The current franchise was granted in 1982 to Kelowna, British Columbia, as the Kelowna Wings. In 1985, the team relocated to Spokane, Washington, and became the Chiefs. Before the Spokane Chiefs, there was another WHL franchise in Spokane, the Spokane Flyers, which played between 1980 and 1982.

The Chiefs won the WHL and CHL Memorial Cup championships in 1991 and 2008. In addition, they have won two division titles and four Western Conference championships. The Chiefs and Portland Winter Hawks are the only United States based teams to win the Memorial Cup. The Chiefs were also the first team in the Western Hockey League to come back from an 0–3 deficit to win a best-of-seven series, which they did against the Portland Winter Hawks in 1996.

The 1991 Memorial Cup team included future NHL players: Ray Whitney, Pat Falloon, Trevor Kidd, Jon Klemm, and Scott Bailey. This team of future NHLers blew through the Memorial Cup tournament, scoring a goal in the first couple of minutes of most games.

The Chiefs' moved to the new Spokane Arena in 1995 and has since hosted many memorable events. In the first year, the Chiefs won 50 games and advanced to the WHL finals, losing in five games to the Brandon Wheat Kings. Two years later, the Chiefs hosted the 1998 Memorial Cup, setting an attendance record at the time. In the 1999–00 season, head coach Mike Babcock led the team from a last place finish the previous year to a first place, 47-win season. The Chiefs advanced to play the Kootenay Ice in the WHL finals, but lost in six games.

Between 2001 and 2005, the Chiefs struggled, going through three head coaches in five years: Perry Ganchar (resigned), Al Conroy (fired) and Bill Peters. Spokane continued to support the team, consistently averaging 6,000–7,000 fans per game, one of the top figures in the Western and Canadian Hockey Leagues. The Chiefs are also known for a goal celebration often called the 'best in junior hockey.' In 1999, the fans were named the best in the WHL. On Saturday nights, often referred to as 'Hockey Night in Spokane', the Spokane Arena is generally sold out, and sellouts are expected when the Tri-City Americans come to town.

The 2007–08 season produced the most wins by a Spokane Chiefs' team since the 1999–00 season, a season which saw the Chiefs go to the WHL Finals. The team, backed by a solid goaltending tandem and an offensive attack led by Carolina Hurricanes' draft pick Drayson Bowman, ranked in the top ten of the CHL for most of the season and reached the #1 spot in late February. The Chiefs beat their arch-rival, the Tri-City Americans, four games to three in the Western Conference finals to earn a spot in the 2008 WHL Finals. Five of the seven games went into overtime, including three games decided in double overtime.

In the Finals, the Chiefs outscored the Lethbridge Hurricanes 15–5 and swept the series 4–0, just as they did in the 1991 WHL playoffs, to earn a trip to the Memorial Cup in Kitchener, Ontario. The Chiefs skated to a perfect 3–0 round-robin record en route to their 2nd Memorial Cup, defeating the host Kitchener Rangers 4–1 in the championship game. The Chiefs remain the only U.S. team ever to win the Memorial Cup on Canadian soil.

The Chiefs and the Portland Winterhawks made history again in the playoffs in 2010, as Portland beat Spokane in the Western Conference quarterfinals, four games to three. It is the only series in Western Hockey League history in which the home team did not win a game.

On May 4, 2010, the Chiefs announced Hardy Sauter's contract was not extended, ending his two-year stint as the team's head coach. Weeks later, former Tri-City coach Don Nachbaur unexpectedly resigned from a coaching position in the AHL and was named the new head coach of the Chiefs hours later.

Nachbaur's first season as head coach was predicted to finish at or near the bottom of the Western Conference, but the Chiefs finished the season with 102 points, the third highest total in team history, and only one point away from the regular season Western Conference title. Led by Tampa Bay Lightning prospect Tyler Johnson, the Chiefs led the league in goals scored and power play goals. The Chiefs also allowed the second fewest goals in the league, led by Ottawa Senators prospect Jared Cowen. Spokane advanced to the Western Conference finals, only to lose to Portland four games to two. Nachbaur was named WHL Coach of the Year for 2011 becoming the only coach in WHL history to win the honor with three different teams: Spokane, Seattle and Tri-City.

Outdoor hockey game
During the 2010 offseason, the Chiefs and the Western Hockey League announced the WHL's first outdoor hockey game would be played in Spokane on January 15, 2011, between the Chiefs and the Kootenay Ice. While the game was welcomed with great excitement in Spokane, many fans questioned the location of the 7,000-seat Avista Stadium, the home of the Spokane Indians baseball club. Joe Albi Stadium, a 28,000-seat facility that usually hosts high school and college football, was thought to be a much-better choice. Chiefs' owner Bobby Brett, who also owns the Indians baseball team, said the Chiefs could not reach an agreement with the city on using Joe Albi. 
Construction crews begin their work at Avista Stadium the week after New Year's. A platform was constructed between first and third base on the baseball field, and then the ice refrigeration unit was placed on top of the platform. It took crews about one week to have the ice rink ready to go.

Weather played a critical role in the lead up to the game and on game day itself. Initial forecasts called for arctic temperatures and more than a foot of snow falling on January 15. That changed the week of the game, when a warm Pacific storm went through the northwest and melted nearly a foot of snow already on the ground in Spokane. The temperatures on game day reached 50-degrees and there was no snow. Moments before the puck dropped, the sky turned cloudy and hid the sun allowing for optimal conditions. In the end, the game was played at Avista Stadium in front of a sell-out crowd of 7,075. While they enjoyed the experience, many fans complained about the view from their seats at Avista Stadium. Fans who bought front-row tickets discovered they were eye-level with the side boards, making only the upper-part of the players' bodies visible and making it impossible to see the puck.

The Chiefs won the game 11–2 over Kootenay, as nine different players scored for Spokane. Brett and the Chiefs organization have said it is very unlikely an outdoor game would ever be played in Spokane again, although the following day general manager Tim Speltz did leave open the possibility of hosting a game at Joe Albi Stadium.

Players

Current roster
Updated January 5, 2023.

 
 
 
 

  

 

 
 
 
 

 

 
 

 

 
 
 

|}

NHL alumni

Club records

Most goals: 68 - Valeri Bure (1992–93)

Most career goals: 147 - Mitch Holmberg (2009-10, 2010-11, 2011-12, 2012-13, 2013-14)

Most assists: 118 - Ray Whitney (1990–91)

Most points: 185 - Ray Whitney (1990–91)

Most points, rookie: 78 - Pat Falloon (1988–89)

Most points, defenceman: 85 - Brenden Kichton (2012–13)

Most penalty minutes: 505 - Kerry Toporowski (1990–91)

Best goals against average, goaltender: 1.97 - Dustin Tokarski (2008–09)

Most shutouts, goaltender: 15 - Dustin Tokarski (2006–07, 2007–08, 2008–09)

Most saves, goaltender: 2,007 - Troy Gamble (1987–88)

Most regular season wins, goaltender: 85 - James Reid (2008–09, 2009–10, 2010–11)

Most single-season games played, goaltender: 67 - Troy Gamble (1987–88)

Most points in standings, team: 107 (2007–08)

Most wins, team: 50 (1995–96), (2007–08)

Longest game: 2:26:05 - 4 OT's (vs. Vancouver - April 10, 2009)  (2nd longest game in WHL history)

Season-by-season record

Regular season
Note: GP = Games played, W = Wins, L = Losses, T = Ties OTL = Overtime losses Pts = Points, GF = Goals for, GA = Goals against

WHL Championship history
1990–91: Win, 4-0 vs Lethbridge
1995–96: Loss, 1-4 vs Brandon
1999–00: Loss, 2-4 vs Kootenay
2007–08: Win, 4-0 vs Lethbridge

Memorial Cup finals history
1991 Win, 5-1 vs Drummondville
2008 Win, 4-1 vs Kitchener

Playoff history

1985–86: Lost to Portland Winter Hawks 5 games to 4 in Conference semi-finals.
1986–87: Lost to Portland Winter Hawks 5 games to 0 in Conference semi-finals.
1987–88: Defeated Victoria Cougars 5 games to 3 in Conference semi-finals. Lost to Kamloops Blazers 5 games to 2 in Conference finals.
1988–89: Out of playoffs.
1989–90: Lost to Kamloops Blazers 5 games to 1 in Conference semi-finals
1990–91: Defeated Seattle Thunderbirds 5 games to 1 in Conference semi-finals. Defeated Kamloops Blazers 5 games to 0 in Conference finals. Defeated Lethbridge Hurricanes 4 games to 0 in WHL finals. WHL CHAMPIONS Finished Memorial Cup round-robin in first place (3–0). Defeated Drummondville Voltigeurs 5–1 to win Memorial Cup. MEMORIAL CUP CHAMPIONS
1991–92: Defeated Portland Winter Hawks 4 games to 2 in Conference quarter-finals. Lost to Seattle Thunderbirds 3 games to 1 in Conference semi-finals.
1992–93: Defeated Tacoma Rockets 4 games to 3 in Conference quarter-finals. Lost to Kamloops Blazers 3 games to 0 in Conference semi-finals.
1993–94: Lost to Seattle Thunderbirds 3 games to 0 in Conference quarter-finals.
1994–95: Advanced past round-robin tournament with 3–1 record. Lost to Tri-City Americans 4 games to 3 in Conference semi-finals.
1995–96: Defeated Portland Winter Hawks 4 games to 3 in Conference quarter-finals. Earned second-round bye. Defeated Kamloops Blazers 4 games to 2 in Conference finals. Lost to Brandon Wheat Kings 4 games to 1 in WHL Finals.
1996–97: Defeated Kelowna Rockets 4 games to 2 in Conference quarter-finals. Lost to Prince George Cougars 3 games to 0 in Conference semi-finals.
1997–98: Defeated Kelowna Rockets 4 games to 3 in Conference quarter-finals. Defeated Prince George Cougars 3 games to 1 in Conference semi-finals. Lost to Portland Winter Hawks 4 games to 3 in Conference finals. Hosted Memorial Cup, finished round-robin in third place (1–2). Lost 2–1 (OT) in Semi-Final to Guelph Storm.
1998–99: Out of playoffs.
1999–00: Defeated Tri-City Americans 4 games to 0 in Conference quarter-finals. Earned second-round bye. Defeated Prince George Cougars 4 games to 1 in Conference finals. Lost to Kootenay Ice 4 games to 2 in WHL finals.
2000–01: Defeated Kamloops Blazers 4 games to 0 in Conference quarter-finals. Defeated Seattle Thunderbirds 3 games to 0 in Conference semi-finals. Lost to Portland Winter Hawks 4 games to 1 in Conference finals.
2001–02: Defeated Tri-City Americans 4 games to 1 in Conference quarter-finals. Lost to Kelowna Rockets 4 games to 2 in Conference semi-finals.
2002–03: Defeated Portland Winter Hawks 4 games to 3 in Conference quarter-finals. Lost to Kelowna Rockets 4 games to 0 in Conference semi-finals.
2003–04: Lost to Everett Silvertips 4 games to 0 in Conference quarter-finals.
2004–05: Out of playoffs.
2005–06: Out of playoffs.
2006–07: Lost to Everett Silvertips 4 games to 2 in Conference quarter-finals.
2007–08: Defeated Everett Silvertips 4 games to 0 in Conference quarter-finals. Defeated Vancouver Giants 4 games to 2 in Conference semi-finals.Defeated Tri-City Americans 4 games to 3 in Conference finals.Defeated Lethbridge Hurricanes 4 games to 0 in WHL finals. WHL CHAMPIONS Finished Memorial Cup round-robin in first place (3–0). Defeated Kitchener Rangers 4–1 to win Memorial Cup. MEMORIAL CUP CHAMPIONS
2008–09: Defeated Seattle Thunderbirds 4 games to 1 in Conference quarter-finals. Lost to Vancouver Giants 4 games to 3 in Conference semi-finals.
2009–10: Lost to Portland Winterhawks 4 games to 3 in Conference quarter-finals.
2010–11: Defeated Chilliwack Bruins 4 games to 1 in Conference quarter-finals. Defeated Tri-City Americans 4 games to 2 in Conference semi-finals. Lost to Portland Winterhawks 4 games to 2 in Conference finals.
2011-12: Defeated Vancouver Giants 4 games to 2 in Conference quarter-finals. Lost to Tri-City Americans 4 games to 3 in Conference semi-finals.
2012-13: Defeated Tri-City Americans 4 games to 1 in Conference quarter-finals. Lost to Portland Winterhawks 4 games to 0 in Conference semi-finals.
2013–14: Lost to Victoria Royals 4 games to 2 in Conference quarter-finals.
2014–15: Lost to Everett Silvertips 4 games to 2 in Conference quarter-finals.
2015–16: Lost to Victoria Royals 4 games to 2 in Conference quarter-finals.
2016–17: Out of playoffs.
2017–18: Lost to Portland Winterhawks 4 games to 3 in Conference quarter-finals.
2018–19: Defeated Portland Winterhawks 4 games to 1 in Conference quarter-finals. Defeated Everett Silvertips 4 games to 1 in Conference semi-finals.Lost to Vancouver Giants 4 games to 1 in Conference finals.
2019–20: No playoffs were held
2020–21: No playoffs were held
2021–22: Lost to Kamloops Blazers 4 games to 0 in Conference quarter-finals.
All-Time Playoff Record (Not Including Memorial Cup Games): 151–145
All-Time Memorial Cup Tournament Record: 9–3

Executives

Head coaches and all-time regular season records
1985–1986 Ernie Gare Jr. (1–5–0)
1985–1986 Marc Pezzin (30–41–1)
1986–1987 Peter Esdale (37–33–2)
1987–1989 Butch Goring (39–41–3)
1989 (Interim)- Bob Strumm (2–4–0)
1988–1989 Gary Braun (21–32–2)
1989–1994 Bryan Maxwell (165–155–22)* Resigned Mid-Season 1993–94
1994 (Interim)- Tim Speltz (1–0)
1994 (Interim)- Perry Shockey (0–1)
1994 (Interim)- Mike Fedorko (9–11–2)
1994–2000 Mike Babcock (234–169–29–2)
1997 (Interim)- Brian Cox (5–2–0)
2000–2002 Perry Ganchar (68–53–18–5)
2003–2005 Al Conroy (82–103–18–13)
2005–2008 Bill Peters (111–81–10–12)
2008 (Interim) Leigh Mendelson (1–0)
2008–2010 Hardy Sauter (91–45–3–5)
2010–2017 Don Nachbaur (86–43–9–6)
2017–2019 Dan Lambert (81–46–5–8)
2019–2020 Emanuel Viveiros (41-18-5)
2020–2022 Adam Maglio (18-36-9)
2022 (Interim) Ryan Smith (12-14-1)
2022–Present Ryan Smith

General managers
1985–1986 Marc Pezzin
1986–1989 Bob Strumm
1989–1990 Brian Maxwell
1990–2016 Tim Speltz
2016–2022 Scott Carter
2022–Present Matt Bardsley

Radio and television coverage
Spokane Chiefs games are broadcast on AM 1510 KGA throughout Eastern Washington, Northern Idaho and parts of British Columbia. The current play-by-play broadcaster of the Chiefs is Mike Boyle, a fill-in sports anchor/reporter for KREM 2. Jay Stewart was the radio voice for Spokane through the 2001 season, taking over for longtime broadcaster Craig West who left the organization to join the Tri-City Americans. Jay Stewart is now the Director of Public Relations for the Spokane Chiefs and is the television announcer during live games.

A half-dozen games are televised in the Spokane market on SWX Right Now, a sports and weather subchannel of KHQ-TV.

Arenas

1950–1995 Spokane Coliseum (5,400 capacity)
1995–Present Spokane Veterans Memorial Arena 9,916 current hockey capacity according to the spokane arena website (old capacity was 10,759)

Chiefs attendance averages and WHL attendance rank

References

External links
Spokane Chiefs website

 
Sports in Spokane, Washington
Ice hockey teams in Washington (state)
Western Hockey League teams
Ice hockey clubs established in 1985
1985 establishments in Washington (state)